Evans Strait is a natural waterway through the central Canadian Arctic Archipelago in the territory of Nunavut. It separates Southampton Island's Bell Peninsula (to the north) from Coats Island (to the south).

Straits of Kivalliq Region